Proceeds of Crime Act may refer to:

 Proceeds of Crime Act 2002, of the United Kingdom
 Proceeds of Crime Act 2002 (Australia), of the Commonwealth Government of Australia
 Proceeds of Crime Act, 1996, of the Republic of Ireland